Dastjerd (also known as Dasteh Jerd, Dast-ī-Jīrd, and Dastjerd Chahār Bolook) is a village in Mohajeran Rural District, Lalejin District, Bahar County, Hamadan Province, Iran. At the 2006 census, its population was 2,907, in 695 families.

References 

Populated places in Bahar County